was the second vessel in the  of three composite hulled, sail-and-steam corvettes of the early Imperial Japanese Navy. It was named for Yamato province, the old name for Nara prefecture and the historic heartland of Japan. The name was used again for the World War II battleship , commissioned in 1941.

Background
Yamato was designed as an iron-ribbed, wooden-hulled, three-masted bark-rigged sloop-of-war with a coal-fired double-expansion reciprocating steam engine with six cylindrical boilers driving a single screw. Yamato was built by the Onohama Shipyards, in Kobe. Her first captain was future Fleet Admiral Tōgō Heihachirō.

Operational history
Yamato saw combat service in the First Sino-Japanese War of 1894-1895, patrolling between Korea, Dairen and Weihaiwei. She was also at the Battle of Yalu River in a reserve capacity in the Western Sea Fleet.

On 21 March 1898, Yamato was designated as a third-class gunboat, and was used for coastal survey and patrol duties.

During the Russo-Japanese War, Yamato served as a guard ship patrolling the Kanmon Straits between Honshū and Kyūshū off of Shimonoseki.  On 28 August 1912, she was reclassified as a second class coastal patrol vessel, and was assigned to coastal survey duties. On 1 April 1922, she was officially re-designated as a survey vessel, and her armament was replaced by two 8-inch guns. During the course of its surveys, Yamato discovered a seamount in the Sea of Japan, which was named after it.

On 1 April 1935, Yamato was retired from navy service and demilitarized. Her hulk was obtained by the Ministry of Justice and relocated to Uraga where she was used as a floating prison and training vessel for juvenile offenders. It was towed to Yokohama harbor during World War II, but was swamped in a typhoon in September 1945 at the mouth of the Tsurumi River in Tokyo Bay. Her hulk was raised and scrapped in 1950.

Notes

References
Chesneau, Roger and Eugene M. Kolesnik (editors), All The World's Fighting Ships 1860–1905, Conway Maritime Press, 1979 reprinted 2002, 

Screw sloops of the Imperial Japanese Navy
1885 ships
First Sino-Japanese War naval ships of Japan
Russo-Japanese War naval ships of Japan
Three-masted ships
Ships built in Japan
Naval ships of Japan
Prison ships
Katsuragi-class corvettes